The Tide Will Swallow Us Whole is the debut album by Trenches. The album was originally titled "950 Times Per Second", possibly as a reference to the rate at which a black hole allegedly spins.

Track listing

Calling - 3:42 (featuring Ryan Clark of Demon Hunter)
Eyes Open - 3:21
Sacrament - 4:01
Trip The Landmine - 4:09
Pathways - 4:52
Bittersweet - 7:14
Call It Correct - 6:17
End - 4:08
Ocean Currents - 3:42
Cornered - 13:32

Awards 

In 2009, the album was nominated for a Dove Award for Recorded Music Packaging of the Year at the 40th GMA Dove Awards.

Credits
Trenches
 Bill Scott - Bass
 Phil Hook - Drums
 Jimmy Ryan - Vocals
 Eli Larch Chastain - Guitars
 Joel David Lauver - Guitars, Backing Vocals, Programming, Keyboards
Additional Musicians
 Ryan Clark - Guest Vocals on track 1, Design
Production
 Invisible Creature - Art Direction
 Troy Glessner - Mastering

External links
 Album from Solid State Records

References

2008 albums
Trenches (band) albums
Solid State Records albums